Newman & Spurr Consultancy (commonly known as NSC) is a training, simulation and consultancy provider headquartered in Camberley, Surrey, England.

Overview
Founded in 1991, the company was responsible for the development and introduction of computer-based wargaming to the Defence Academy of the United Kingdom and has been a provider of training at the Kuwait Armed Forces' Mubarak Al Abdullah Joint Command and Staff College since its foundation in 1996.

In January 2017, NSC was competitively selected to deliver the British Army's Unit Based Virtual Training (UBVT) capability. The contract, which is worth circa £4 million and will run for up to five years, will see NSC manage a diverse range of virtual exercises designed to prepare Regular and Reserve personnel for future operations.

The company is also contributing to efforts to ensure the British Army is neither out-fought nor out-thought on the battlefields of tomorrow. NSC was contracted by the Ministry of Defence to ensure the Centre for Historical Analysis and Conflict Research (CHACR) reached full operational capability by the end of 2015. Working alongside select partners from academia and industry, the training, simulation and consultancy specialist continues to provide technical and project management support to the think-tank, which is tasked with informing military doctrine and force development and becoming a hub for the generation of soldier-scholars.

Previously, NSC’s Joint Operations Command and Staff Training System (JOCASTS) helped the British Army to collectively prepare brigades and battlegroups for deployments to Iraq and Afghanistan, and its Joint Combat Operations Virtual Environment (JCOVE) – UBVT's predecessor – readied more than 16,000 British personnel for operations.

In 2013, NSC and Atkins were contracted by the UK Ministry of Defence to help develop and support a range of innovative computer-based instruction methods for the British Army’s Captains’ Warfare Course.

The company has also supported training exercises for NATO’s Allied Rapid Reaction Corps  and provided the UK’s Defence Science and Technology Laboratory with a synthetic environment in which to explore means of improving maritime marksmanship. More recently, NSC has provided analysts to the NATO Communication and Information Agency in support of work to identify the resources needed by the multinational organisation to meet its operational ambitions.

Neman and Spurr was bought by QinetiQ in 2020 for £14million.

References

Consulting firms of the United Kingdom